Corinne Müller (born 20 November 1975 in Brugg) is a retired Swiss athlete who specialised in the high jump. She represented her country at the 2004 Summer Olympics without reaching the final. Her indoor personal best of 1.92 metres is the Swiss national record for the event. She also occasionally competed in the long jump and triple jump.

Competition record

Personal bests
Outdoor
High jump – 1.93 (Zug 2005)
Long jump – 5.90 (+0.1 m/s) (Basel 2004)
Triple jump – 12.87 (-0.4 m/s) (Basel 2004)
Indoor
High jump – 1.92 (Magglingen 2005) NR
Triple jump – 13.01 (Magglingen 2005)

References

1975 births
Living people
People from Brugg
Swiss female high jumpers
Olympic athletes of Switzerland
Athletes (track and field) at the 2004 Summer Olympics
Sportspeople from Aargau